The Lacey V. Murrow Memorial Bridge is a floating bridge in the Seattle metropolitan area of the U.S. state of Washington. It is one of the Interstate 90 floating bridges that carries the eastbound lanes of Interstate 90 across Lake Washington from Seattle to Mercer Island. Westbound traffic is carried by the adjacent Homer M. Hadley Memorial Bridge.

The original Murrow Bridge opened in 1940, and was named the Lake Washington Floating Bridge. It was renamed the Lacey V. Murrow bridge in 1967. The original bridge closed   the current bridge opened 

Along with the east portals of the Mount Baker Ridge Tunnel, the bridge is an official City of Seattle landmark and a National Historic Civil Engineering Landmark.

History

The bridge was the brainchild of engineer Homer Hadley, who had made the first proposal in 1921. The bridge came about after intensive lobbying, particularly by George Lightfoot, who came to be called the "father of the bridge." Lightfoot began campaigning for the bridge in 1930, enlisting the support of Miller Freeman. Construction began January 1, 1939 and was completed in 1940. The construction cost for the project, including approaches, was approximately $9 million. It was partially financed by a bond issue of $4.184 million. Opened July 2, 1940, the bridge carried US 10 (later decommissioned and renamed Interstate 90). Tolls were removed in 1949. The bridge sank in a storm on November 25, 1990 during refurbishment and repair. The current bridge was built in 1993. The eponymous Lacey V. Murrow  was the second director of the Washington State Highway Department and a highly decorated U.S. Air Force officer who served as a bomber pilot in World War II, rising to the rank of   graduate of Washington State College in Pullman, he was the oldest brother of CBS commentator Edward R. Murrow.

The original bridge was built under a -year contract awarded to the Puget Sound Bridge and Dredging Company in the amount of $3.254 million. It included a movable span that could be retracted into a pocket in the center of the fixed span to permit large boats to pass.  This design resulted in a roadway bulge that required vehicles to swerve twice across polished steel joints as they passed the bulge.  A reversible lane system, indicated by lighted overhead lane control signals with arrow and 'X' signs, compounded the hazard by putting one lane of traffic on the "wrong" side of the bulge during morning and evening rush hours in an effort to alleviate traffic into or out of Seattle.  There were many serious collisions on the bridge.  The problems grew worse as the traffic load increased over the years and far outstripped the designed capacity.  Renovation or replacement became essential and a parallel bridge, the Homer M. Hadley Memorial Bridge, was completed in 1989, and named for Hadley in 1993.

With the opening of the new bridge, the 49-year-old Murrow Bridge closed on June 23, 1989, for renovation that was projected to take

1990 disaster

On November 25, 1990, while under re-construction, the original bridge sank because of a series of human errors and decisions. The process started because the bridge needed resurfacing and was to be widened by means of cantilevered additions in order to meet the necessary lane-width specifications of the Interstate Highway System. The Washington State Department of Transportation (WSDOT) decided to use hydrodemolition (high-pressure water) to remove unwanted material (the sidewalks on the bridge deck). Water from this hydrodemolition was considered contaminated under environmental law and could not be allowed to flow into Lake Washington. Engineers then analyzed the pontoons of the bridge, and realized that they were over-engineered and the water could be stored temporarily in the pontoons. The watertight doors for the pontoons were therefore removed.

A large storm on November 22–24 (the Thanksgiving holiday weekend), filled some of the pontoons with rain and lake water. On Saturday, November 24, workers noticed that the bridge was about to sink, and started pumping out some of the pontoons; on Sunday, November 25, a  section of the bridge sank, dumping the contaminated water into the lake along with tons of bridge material. It sank when one pontoon filled and dragged the rest down, because they were cabled together and there was no way to separate the sections under load. No one was hurt or killed, since the bridge was closed for renovation and the sinking took  All of the sinking was captured on film and shown on live TV. The cost of the disaster was $69 million in damages. Westbound traffic was allowed  and eastbound traffic was resumed in early December.

The disaster delayed the bridge's reopening by 14 months, to September 12, 1993.

Precedents and lessons learned
WSDOT had lost another floating bridge, the Hood Canal Bridge, in February 1979  under similar circumstances.  It is now known that the other major floating bridge in Washington, the Evergreen Point Floating Bridge, was under-engineered for local environmental conditions; that 1963 bridge was replaced with a new floating span

See also

List of bridges documented by the Historic American Engineering Record in Washington (state)
List of bridges in Seattle
Homer M. Hadley Memorial Bridge

Notes

External links
 
 Bridge Camera, includes some weather information
 
 King-5 television video of the sinking

Bridge disasters in the United States
Bridge disasters caused by construction error
Bridges in Seattle
Bridges in King County, Washington
Bridges completed in 1993
Bridges completed in 1940
Interstate 90
Landmarks in Seattle
Monuments and memorials in Washington (state)
Historic Civil Engineering Landmarks
Road bridges in Washington (state)
Bridges on the Interstate Highway System
Transportation disasters in Washington (state)
Former toll bridges in Washington (state)
1940 establishments in Washington (state)
Construction accidents in the United States
Pontoon bridges in the United States
Former National Register of Historic Places in Washington (state)
Historic American Engineering Record in Washington (state)